WCON (1450 kHz) is an AM radio station broadcasting a soft adult contemporary format. Licensed to Cornelia, Georgia, United States, the station is currently owned by Habersham Broadcasting Company.

References

External links

CON (AM)
Radio stations established in 1953
Soft adult contemporary radio stations in the United States
1953 establishments in Georgia (U.S. state)